Nicola Bealing (born 1963) is a Cornwall-based British painter. She is an Academian of the Royal West of England Academy, RWA. The Cornwall Artists Index describes Bealing’s “wit and skill … [as employing] the unexpected and unusual in her figurative and abstract work."

Biography
Bealing was born in Hertford and educated in England. She completed the foundation course in art at Herts College of Art and Design in St Albans in 1983 and began the diploma course in Fine Art at the  Byam Shaw School of Art in London in 1984. In 1988 she relocated to Cornwall. Bealing has participated in a large number of group shows. Notable among these was the 1992 South-West Open Exhibition, held at the Plymouth Arts Centre and at Plymouth City Museum & Art Gallery and where Bealing won first prize. In 1995 Bealing was awarded First Prize at the Millfield School Open Exhibition.

Bealing has had a number of solo exhibitions. In 1989 she has a solo show in Jersey at the St Helier Galleries and has had shows at Cadogan Contemporary in both 2000 and 2001. Bealing has completed commissioned works for the Embassy of Oman and, in 1989, a large mural for the Quayside Fish Centre at Porthleven.

References

External links

1963 births
Living people
20th-century English women artists
21st-century English women artists
Alumni of the Byam Shaw School of Art
British printmakers
English women painters
People from Hertford
Women printmakers